MCPO is a chemical compound that can be used to produce chemiluminescence. MCPO is mainly used for its chemiluminescent properties and is most commonly used in demonstrations of chemiluminescence as a safer alternative to TCPO. It is used as an alternative to TCPO due to its safer reaction product of methyl salicylate rather than the product of TCP, 2,4,6-trichlorophenol, a known carcinogen.

Synthesis
MCPO is synthesized by reacting methyl salicylate with oxalyl chloride in a solution of THF and pyridine:

Pyridine reacts with HCl produced forming the THF insoluble pyridine hydrochloride salt. Water is then added to the solution to dissolve the precipitated pyridine HCl and decrease the solubility of the MCPO in solution, causing it to precipitate. The MCPO precipitate is then filtered and washed with water to remove contaminants.

See also
TCPO

References

Chemiluminescence
Salicylate esters
Methyl esters
Oxalate esters
Salicylyl esters